The Rosenberg/Humphrey Program in Public Policy (also known as the Marvin Rosenberg/Hubert H. Humphrey Program in Public Policy) is a fellowship program out of the City College of New York. The fellowship offers admitted students a stipend to complete summer internships of their choosing, either in Washington D.C. or New York City. The fellowships are intended to be policy centered.

Origin 
The fellowship was established in 1984 by Marvin Rosenberg, a friend of U.S. senator Hubert H. Humphrey.

Past Internship Placements 
Interns have held positions in various local, state, and national organizations, both governmental and non-for-profit. Below is a list of past organizations that RH fellows have worked for:

Africa Policy Information Center
American Civil Liberties Union
Americans for Democratic Action
Brookings Institution
Center for Community Change
City of New York, Department of Business Services
Common Cause
Congressional Offices including Hillary Clinton, Charles Rangel, and Major Owens
Constituency for Africa
Council on Hemispheric Affairs
Department of Health and Human Services
Department of Transportation
Earth Day Network
House Committee on Small Business
General Accounting Office
Institute for Policy Studies
Justice Department
Lambda Legal Defense and Education Fund
Leadership Conference on Civil Rights
League of United Latin American Citizens
Library of Congress
Mexican American Legal Defense and Education Fund
NASA
National Asian Pacific-American Legal Consortium
National Council of La Raza
National Organization for Women
National Urban League
OMB Watch
Physicians for Social Responsibility
Public Defender Service
Public Voice for Food and Health Policy
US General Services Administration Office
Equal Employment Opportunity

References

External links
Rosenberg/Humphrey Program official website 
the City College of New York Official website 

City College of New York
Fellowships